Harlem: Diary of a Summer is the second studio album by American hip hop recording artist Jim Jones. The album was released on August 23, 2005, in the United States, under Diplomat and Koch. The first single from Harlem: Diary of a Summer is "Baby Girl". The single didn't chart on the Billboard Hot 100, but it did manage to peak at #58 on the Hot R&B/Hip-Hop Singles & Tracks chart. The follow-up single, "Summer Wit Miami", peaked at #78 on the same chart.

Commercial performance
The album debuted at number five on the Billboard 200 with 74,000 copies sold in the first week of release, making it the rapper's highest-peaking album to date.

Track listing

Sample credits
"My Diary" contains a sample of "Living Inside Your Love" performed by Earl Klugh.
"G's Up" contains a sample of "I Think You Need Love" performed by Dionne Warwick.
"Confront Ya Babe" contains a sample of "Journey to Transylvania" performed by Alan Silvestri.
"Summer wit Miami" contains a sample of "Between the Sheets" performed by The Isley Brothers.
"Tupac Joint" contains a sample of "Homies & Thuggs" performed by Scarface and Master P.

Charts

Weekly charts

Year-end charts

References

2005 albums
Jim Jones (rapper) albums
Albums produced by Pete Rock
Diplomat Records albums
E1 Music albums